Ranule Gomes dos Reis (14 May 1993 – 24 January 2021), commonly known as Ranule, was a Brazilian footballer. He died in the 2021 Palmas FR plane crash.

Career statistics

Club

Notes

References

1993 births
2021 deaths
Brazilian footballers
Association football goalkeepers
Campeonato Brasileiro Série D players
Democrata Futebol Clube players
Villa Nova Atlético Clube players
Clube Atlético Itapemirim players
Tupi Football Club players
Associação Atlética Portuguesa (RJ) players
Sampaio Corrêa Futebol e Esporte players
Palmas Futebol e Regatas players
Victims of aviation accidents or incidents in Brazil
Victims of aviation accidents or incidents in 2021
Sportspeople from Minas Gerais